Alfred Hierl (8 March 1910 – 25 September 1950) was a German artist from Munich. In 1936 he won a silver medal in the art competitions of the Olympic Games for his poster "Internationales Avusrennen" ("International Avus Race").

Hierl died in Traunstein. Several paintings are exhibited in the Canadian War Museum Ottawa.

References

External links
 profile

1910 births
1950 deaths
German poster artists
Olympic silver medalists in art competitions
German war artists
World War II artists
Olympic competitors in art competitions
Medalists at the 1936 Summer Olympics